This is a list of Czech international footballers, comprising all players to have represented the Czech Republic women's national football team since its formation in 1993.

List of players
This table takes into account all Czech Republic women's official international matches played up to and including 30 October 2013

References

 
Czech Republic women
Association football player non-biographical articles